Brit Poalei Eretz Yisrael Haifa F.C. was an Arab football club from Haifa, Israel. The club was organized within Brit Poalei Eretz Yisrael, an Arab Workers Union affiliated with the Histadrut.

The club joined the second division in 1946–47, and played in the second division, designated Liga Meuhedet (lit. 'Special League') after the Israeli Declaration of Independence, becoming one of the first two Arab clubs in the Israeli football leagues (along with Brit Poalei Eretz Yisrael Nazareth). The club finished bottom of its division in both seasons it played in the league.

References

1947 establishments in Mandatory Palestine
1952 disestablishments in Israel
Association football clubs established in 1947
Association football clubs disestablished in 1952
Defunct football clubs in Israel
Football clubs in Haifa
History of Haifa
Arab-Israeli football clubs